Tukahur Rural District is a rural district (dehestan) in the Tukahur District of Minab County, Hormozgan Province, Iran. At the 2006 census, its population was 7,852, in 1,657 families.  The rural district has 14 villages.

References 

Rural Districts of Hormozgan Province
Minab County